Chiloneus elegans is a species of weevils in the tribe Sciaphilini. It is found in Greece.

References

External links 

 
 Chiloneus elegans at insectoid.info

Entiminae
Beetles described in 1906
Fauna of Greece